Order of Cincinnatus may refer to:
 The Society of the Cincinnati, an organization in the United States and France founded in 1783 to preserve the ideals and fellowship of the Revolutionary War officers who fought for American independence
 The New Order of Cincinnatus, a political organization in the 1930s, founded in Seattle and present in various degrees elsewhere on the West Coast of the United States